The Eastern Shore Railroad, Inc.  was a Class III short-line railroad that began operations in October 1981 on the  former Virginia and Maryland Railroad line on the Delmarva Peninsula. The line ran between Pocomoke City, Maryland, and Norfolk, Virginia, interchanging with the Norfolk Southern Railway at both ends.

Delmarva had been previously served by the New York, Philadelphia and Norfolk Company (NYP&N) led by William Lawrence Scott which ran south down the peninsula to a freight depot, terminal and harbor at the headland point at Cape Charles, Virginia, a town which it founded and laid out in 1883–84. A ferry barge system then operated crossing the lower Chesapeake Bay to the Norfolk piers. The NYP&N was later absorbed by the Pennsylvania Railroad, which dominated the eastern U.S. along with the New York Central Railroad and the Baltimore and Ohio Railroad in the first half of the 20th century.

A rail ferry service was used to span the  water route across the Chesapeake Bay between Cape Charles and Norfolk. The ferry service used two barges (car floats) of 25 and 15 car capacity, moved by contracted tug boats.  This car float operation has been in continuous service since April 1885, and is one of only two remaining in the United States (the other being New York New Jersey Rail, LLC).

The Eastern Shore Railroad was taken over in February 2006 by Cassatt Management, LLC., and was operated and renamed as the Bay Coast Railroad. The Bay Coast Railroad operated the line until May 18, 2018. In June 2018, the Delmarva Central Railroad took over the portion between Pocomoke City and Hallwood, Virginia where the remaining customers were located. Service on the Norfolk side was taken over by the Buckingham Branch Railroad.

See also
 Train ferry: United States for a list of current and former car floats and train ferries
 Bay Coast Railroad

References

Further reading
Dickon, Chris. Eastern Shore Railroad. United States: Arcadia, 2006.

External links

Defunct Maryland railroads
Defunct Virginia railroads
Spin-offs of Conrail